The Department Secretaries of Cesar Department are the secretaries in charge of supporting the functions of the Governor of Cesar Department on specific areas.

Secretaries

 Secretary of Government of Cesar Department
 Secretary of Finances of Cesar Department
 Secretary of Health of Cesar Department
 Secretary General of Cesar Department
 Secretary of Mines of Cesar Department
 Secretary of Infrastructure and Public Works of Cesar Department
 Office of Planning
 Office of Judicial Affairs
 Secretary of General Management
 Secretary of Education, Culture and Sports
 Secretary of Agriculture and Entrepreneurship

See also

Government of Cesar Department
Governor of Cesar Department

External links
 Government of Cesar Department official website

Government of Cesar Department